The 1993-94 FIBA Women's European Champions Cup was the 36th edition of the competition. It was won by the Ginnastica Comense for the first time against Popular Basquet Godella, who couldn't defend the title for a second time, in a replay of the past season's final match. Format changes were introduced for this edition.

Competition results

1st Preliminary Round

|}

2nd Preliminary Round

|}

Semi-final Round

Quarter-finals

 if necessary

Final Four

References

Champions Cup
EuroLeague Women seasons